Judge Marshall may refer to:

Alina I. Marshall (born 1977), judge of the United States Tax Court
Consuelo Bland Marshall (born 1936), judge of the United States District Court for the Central District of California
D. Price Marshall Jr. (born 1963), judge of the United States District Court for the Eastern District of Arkansas
John Augustine Marshall (1854–1941), judge of the United States District Court for the District of Utah
Prentice Marshall (1926–2004), judge of the United States District Court for the Northern District of Illinois
Thurgood Marshall (1908–1993), judge of the United States Court of Appeals for the Second Circuit before serving on the United States Supreme Court

See also
Justice Marshall (disambiguation)